Saint Arnaud (previously Rotoiti) is a small alpine village in the Tasman district of New Zealand's South Island, west of the mountains of the Saint Arnaud Range and 90 kilometres southwest of Nelson near the historic Tophouse Settlement. It is situated at the northern end of Lake Rotoiti.

Naming 

The village was called Rotoiti until 1921, when it was renamed by the Department of Lands and Survey to avoid confusion with other communities of the same name. Archives show that between 1921 and 1951 both names were unofficially used by local residents and government agencies when referring to the village area.

Such references include a letter dated 1 June 1950 from the Chief Surveyor of the Nelson District Office of the Department of Lands and Survey to the New Zealand Geographic Board stating that "for many years confusion has occurred due to correspondence addressed to the residents and visitors at Lake Rotoiti in the Nelson Land District going to Lake Rotoiti, near Rotorua, in the Auckland Land District. Due to the same confusion of names, the Town of Rotoiti in the Nelson Land District was altered to Town of St. Arnaud by this Department." However, the name St. Arnaud did not receive legal approval until it was gazetted on 19 July 1951. Some locals were opposed to this change, as shown by a 4 December 1950 petition held by the New Zealand Geographic Board opposing the name change. Some local residents today still give their address as Lake Rotoiti, even with St. Arnaud as the official name.

A proposal with the New Zealand Geographic Board to either change the village's name back to its original name of Rotoiti or to use a dual name (a relatively common practice in New Zealand), failed in 2007. A survey had originally indicated that just over half of the area residents supported a return to the original name.

Demographics 
It is part of the wider Murchison-Nelson Lakes statistical area.

Saint Arnaud had a population of 111 at the 2018 New Zealand census, an increase of 6 people (5.7%) since the 2013 census, and an increase of 33 people (42.3%) since the 2006 census. There were 54 households. There were 60 males and 54 females, giving a sex ratio of 1.11 males per female. The median age was 54.5 years (compared with 37.4 years nationally), with 9 people (8.1%) aged under 15 years, 15 (13.5%) aged 15 to 29, 60 (54.1%) aged 30 to 64, and 27 (24.3%) aged 65 or older.

Ethnicities were 89.2% European/Pākehā, 5.4% Māori, 2.7% Asian, and 8.1% other ethnicities (totals add to more than 100% since people could identify with multiple ethnicities).

Although some people objected to giving their religion, 67.6% had no religion, 18.9% were Christian and 2.7% had other religions.

Of those at least 15 years old, 30 (29.4%) people had a bachelor or higher degree, and 15 (14.7%) people had no formal qualifications. The median income was $35,000, compared with $31,800 nationally. The employment status of those at least 15 was that 51 (50.0%) people were employed full-time, 24 (23.5%) were part-time, and 0 (0.0%) were unemployed.

Government 
Saint Arnaud falls under the Tasman District Council authority. The current mayor of Tasman is Tim King. Nationally, Saint Arnaud falls under the West Coast-Tasman electorate, which is currently held by Damien O'Connor of the Labour Party.

Amenities 
Mostly catering for a small number of locals and tramping and skiing tourists, the centre of Saint Arnaud has a village store with postal services, a petrol station, a cafe-restaurant, camping facilities, motels, chalets and specialist accommodation for trampers at the Travers-Sabine Lodge youth hostel. A water taxi service operates from a jetty at the northern end of Lake Rotoiti, near to a DOC campsite at Kerr Bay. There is another campsite at West Bay. A daily shuttle bus service along State Highway 63 provides connections to Nelson, Murchison, Greymouth, Blenheim, Westport and Picton.

The Royal New Zealand Air Force's field training base is nearby at Dip Flat.

Attractions

Nelson Lakes National Park 

The western part of the township includes a local Department of Conservation (DOC) Visitor Centre, with interactive displays and comprehensive information about the wildlife and environmental management of the Nelson Lakes National Park. The centre has a team of professional staff who can offer detailed advice and guidance about all aspects of the area. A number of local footpaths, tracks and nature trails, suitable for all abilities, are maintained by the department.

Saint Arnaud is a starting point for the strenuous 80 km Travers - Sabine tramping circuit. This follows the valley of the Travers River, ascends over the sub-alpine Travers Saddle, the watershed, and then descends the Sabine River valley and gorge to Lake Rotoroa. From here walkers can complete the circuit back to Saint Arnaud by either crossing a low saddle to the valley of Lake Rotoiti, via the Speargrass Track, or by ascending a higher route via Mount Angelus. Alternatively, they can take a water taxi from the DOC Sabine Hut on Lake Rotoroa up to the northern end of the lake.

In winter, snow sports take place primarily at Rainbow Skifield on the eastern side of the Saint Arnaud Range. Other local recreational activities include fishing, hunting, kayaking, small boat sailing, and gliding.

Infrastructure 
State Highway 63 passes through Saint Arnaud, linking the town to Blenheim and Marlborough in the east and Murchison and the West Coast in the west. Korere Tophouse Road leaves SH 63 four kilometres east of Saint Arnaud, and provides the most direct route to Richmond and Nelson.

Network Tasman owns and operates the electricity distribution network in Saint Arnaud.

The Tasman District Council operates reticulated stormwater and wastewater systems in Saint Arnaud, but not a reticulated fresh water supply. Individual properties are required to build and maintain their own fresh water supply.

Education
Lake Rotoiti School is the sole school in Saint Arnaud, serving approximately  students from years 1 to 8 (ages 5 to 12).

References

Further reading 
 Darroch Donald (2003) Footprint Guide to New Zealand, 2nd edition, pp 481–483
 Jim Dufresne (2002) Tramping in New Zealand, 5th edition, Lonely Planet Books

External links

Populated places in the Tasman District
Populated lakeshore places in New Zealand